Pär Lindh (born Pär Olov Aron Lind, 24 March 1959) is a Swedish composer, musician and founding member of the Swedish symphonic rock group Pär Lindh Project.

Before working in a band, Lindh had several careers. These included church organist, touring classical pianist, solo harpsichordist, drummer, Hammond organist, and jazz and ragtime entertainer. During 1977 and 1978, Lindh played in hard rock bands such as Antenna Baroque and Vincebus Eruptum. However, he decided to leave the rock scene in 1979 to become a classical player in France. In 1989, Lindh returned to Sweden to pursue his interest in progressive rock.

1991–1994
In 1991, Lindh and several friends founded The Swedish Art Rock Society. The society's purpose was to start a festival that would serve as a starting point for the current wave of progressive and art rock. During this period, Lindh (alongside Jocke Ramsell and the late Magdalena Hagberg), made his first record with the Crimsonic Label, Gothic Impressions.

1995–1999
Lindh continued working with Ramsell and Hagberg, and together with Nisse Bielfeld and Marcus Jäderholm, they formed Pär Lindh Project.
In 1996 the concept album Bilbo was released, inspired by J. R. R. Tolkien's first book The Hobbit.
PLP headlined the 1997 Rio Art Rock Festival and played other dates in Brazil and Argentina.
Late 1997 saw the release of Mundus Incompertus.

2000–present
PLP are always received well on tour, and have won several prizes for "Best band of festival".
After the summer 2000 tour PLP continued as the trio Magdalena, Nisse and Pär to record PLP's third album Veni Vidi Vici.
In 2002 the band suffered a setback due to illness. However, they did a strong return in 2004, and started recording a new album. 
In 2009, Lindh wanted to start a new band with some teenagers from the area. The band's name became The Willburgers.
In 2011 his album with PLP, Time Mirror, was recorded.

Discography

Pär Lindh Project
Gothic Impressions (1994)
Rondo (1996)
Mundus Incompertus (1997)
Veni Vidi Vici (2001)
Time Mirror (2011)

Live Album
Live in America (1999)
Live in Iceland (2002)

Pär Lindh and Björn Johansson
Bilbo (1996)
Dreamsongs from the Middle Earth (2004)

With others
The Book of Bilbo and Gandalf (2010) with Steve Hackett, John Hackett & Marco Lo Muscio

Video
Live in Poland (2008)

References
Pär Lindh, "History"

Notes

External links 
Official site

Swedish composers
Swedish rock musicians
Swedish keyboardists
1959 births
Living people